The Chief Judge of Sabah and Sarawak (Malay: Hakim Besar Sabah dan Sarawak), formerly the Chief Justice of Borneo, is the office and title of the head of the High Court of Sabah and Sarawak. The title has been in use since 24 June 1994, when the High Court of Sabah and Sarawak was renamed from the High Court of Borneo.

The High Court of Sabah and Sarawak is the third highest court of Malaysia alongside the High Court in Malaya. As such, the Chief Judge of Sabah and Sarawak is the fourth highest position in Malaysian judicial system after the Chief Justice of Malaysia, President of the Court of Appeal of Malaysia and the Chief Judge of Malaya.

Constitutional basis 
The office of Chief Judge of the High Court of Sabah and Sarawak is established under Article 122 of the Constitution of Malaysia, which establishes the then-Supreme Court (now Federal Court) as consisting of a Lord President (now Chief Justice), the Chief Judges of the High Courts of Malaya together with that of Sabah and Sarawak and at least four other judges and such additional judges as may be appointed pursuant to Clause (1A).

Role 
The Chief Judge is first among equals among the judges of the High Court of Sabah and Sarawak, and the position differs little from that of the other judges. All judges, including the Chief Judge, are appointed by the Yang di-Pertuan Agong (King of Malaysia), on the advice of the Prime Minister of Malaysia. Under Article 125 of the Malaysian Constitution, they can be removed only by the Yang di-Pertuan Agong, on a recommendation from a tribunal consisting of at least five judges who are current or former Federal Court judges. Reasons for removal include the Chief Judge:
 not following the Judges’ Code of Ethics; or
 being physically or mentally unable to carry out his or her duties.
The prime minister will then provide the Yang di-Pertuan Agong the reason(s) why the Chief Judge should be removed. The Yang di-Pertuan Agong will then proceed to set up the tribunal to make a decision.

List of Chief Justices and Chief Judges

Chief Justices of Sarawak (1930 to 1951)

Chief Justices of North Borneo (1934 to 1951)

Chief Justices of the Unified Judiciary of Sarawak, North Borneo and Brunei (1951 to 1963)

Chief Justices of Borneo (1963 to 1994)

Chief Judges of Sabah and Sarawak (1994 to present)

See also 
 Courts of Malaysia
 High Courts (Malaysia)

References 

Malaysian judges
Judiciary of Malaysia